Black Lake is an unincorporated community in Colfax County, New Mexico approximately 6 miles south of Angel Fire on New Mexico State Road 434. The village had a post office from 1903 until it was closed in 1927. The town has a small chapel, San Antonio Catholic Church, overseen by Immaculate Conception in Cimarron, New Mexico.

References

Unincorporated communities in Colfax County, New Mexico